John Melville Kelly (1879–1962) was an American painter and printmaker.

Biography 
He was born in Oakland, California in 1879. He studied art at the Mark Hopkins Institute of Art (now the San Francisco Art Institute), the Partington Art School (San Francisco) and with Eric Spencer Macky.

Kelly worked for fourteen years as an illustrator for the San Francisco Examiner, and had even been a prizefighter, before he and his wife, the sculptor Kate Kelly, went to Hawaii in 1923.  Their plan was to stay a year, working for an advertising agency creating material to promote tourism.  They fell in love with the islands and the people and stayed permanently.  Kate took a class in printmaking at the University of Hawaii with Huc-Mazelet Luquiens (1881–1961), and then taught John the techniques.

John’s ravishing depictions of Polynesians was, in fact, what distinguished him from other artists in Hawaii at the time.  The Kellys immediately identified with the native Hawaiians and became their champions in images and in print.  John produced etchings and aquatints, primarily of human figures, though he occasionally did landscapes as well.  He authored and illustrated "Etchings and Drawings of Hawaiians" in 1943, and "The Hula as Seen in Hawaii" in 1955.  John Melville Kelly died in Honolulu in 1962.

The Hawaii State Art Museum, the Honolulu Museum of Art, and the Nelson-Atkins Museum of Art (Kansas City, Missouri), Saint Joseph College Art Gallery (West Hartford, Connecticut) and the San Diego Museum of Art (San Diego, California) are among the public collections holding work by John Melville Kelly.

References
 Drucker, Natasha Roessler, John Melville Kelly: Hawaiian Idyll, Honolulu Academy of Arts, 2009, .
 Forbes, David W., Encounters with Paradise: Views of Hawaii and its People, 1778-1941, Honolulu Academy of Arts, 1992, 215-262.
 Forbes, David W., He Makana, The Gertrude Mary Joan Damon Haig Collection of Hawaiian Art, Paintings and Prints, Hawaii State Foundation of Culture and the Arts, 2013, pp. 72–75
 Kelly, John Melville, Etchings and Drawings of Hawaiians, Honolulu Star-bulletin, Ltd, 1943.
 Kelly, John Melville, The Hula as Seen in Hawaii, Honolulu Star-bulletin, Ltd, 1955.
 Morse, Morse (ed.), Honolulu Printmakers, Honolulu, HI, Honolulu Academy of Arts, 2003, pp. 15 & 34, 
 Yoshihara, Lisa A., Collective Visions, 1967-1997, [Hawaii] State Foundation on Culture and the Arts, Honolulu, Hawaii, 1997, 37.

1879 births
1962 deaths
19th-century American painters
19th-century American male artists
American male painters
20th-century American painters
Printmakers from Hawaii
20th-century American printmakers
20th-century American male artists